Shawkat Ali Emon (born 1968–69) is a Bangladeshi music composer. He won Bangladesh National Film Award for Best Music Director for the film Purno Doirgho Prem Kahini (2013). he also won Babisas Awards for Best Music Director in film Black Money (2015). He also served as one of the judges of the television show Black Horse RTV Golden Key – Ebar Tomra Gao. In the 1990s, he was a member of the musical bands Chime and Pentagon. He has composed music for 116 films.

Background
Emon was born in Dhaka in the then East Pakistan. His father, Abdus Salam, was a writer from Manikganj District.

Career
In his early years, Emon served as an assistant of music composer Satya Saha.

Emon debuted his film career through the film Rooti (1996). He performed as a playback singer for a few films under the pseudonym  Saimon. He composed music of Akhi Alamgir's debut album, Tomar Chokh (2011) and Tareen Jahan's debut album Akash Debo Kakey (2011).

Works

1990s

2000s

2010s

2020s

Lyrics

Background score only

Personal life
Emon was married to actress Bijori Barkatullah from 1995 to 2012.  Together they have a daughter Urbana Shawkat. Emon has five sisters, Abida Sultana, Rebeka, Rehena, Chitra and Salma (d. 2016), and a brother, Mohammad Ali Shumon. Shumon is the founding member of the band Pentagon.

In 2013, Emon then married Jinat Kabir Tithi. In 2014, he was arrested after a blackmail attempt complaint was filed by Tithi. He later denied the allegations and the case did not result in convictions. The marriage ended in divorce as well.

Emon married his third wife Hridita Reza, a news presenter in a private television channel, on 27 February 2020. On 27 September, Emon was arrested by the police after Reza accused him of physically torturing her in a case.

References

External links
 

Living people
1960s births
People from Manikganj District
Bangladeshi film score composers
Best Music Director National Film Award (Bangladesh) winners
Date of birth missing (living people)
Place of birth missing (living people)